Gord Garvie (25 October 1944 – 6 August 1988) was a Canadian wrestler. He competed in two events at the 1968 Summer Olympics.

References

External links
 

1944 births
1988 deaths
Canadian male sport wrestlers
Olympic wrestlers of Canada
Wrestlers at the 1968 Summer Olympics
Sportspeople from Saskatoon